Brydon Lake is a small lake located west of the hamlet of Andes in Delaware County, New York. Brydon Lake drains south via an unnamed creek which flows into Fall Clove Brook, which flows into the Pepacton Reservoir.

See also
 List of lakes in New York

References 

Lakes of New York (state)
Lakes of Delaware County, New York